Oh Man-seok (born January 30, 1975) is a South Korean actor. Best known for playing the titular transgender singer in rock musical Hedwig and the Angry Inch, Oh's acting career spans theater, television and film.

Career

Theater beginnings
Oh Man-seok graduated from the School of Drama at Korea National University of Arts with a BFA in Acting. He made his stage debut in Faust in 1999. One of his early notable roles was as the androgynous court jester Gong-gil who becomes the object of obsession of the tyrant King Yeonsan in Yi, which would later be adapted into the hit 2005 film King and the Clown. Highly acclaimed for his portrayal of Gong-gil, Oh was awarded Best New Actor by the National Theater Association of Korea for the play's first run in 2000, and he reprised the role four more times in 2001, 2003, 2006, and 2010.

More roles followed in The Rocky Horror Show (2001), Return to the Forbidden Planet (2002), Grease (2003), Singin' in the Rain (2004), The Seagull (2004), Woyzeck (2004), and Assassins (2005).

Hedwig and the Angry Inch
But Oh became a bonafide musical theatre superstar in 2005, when he was cast as the titular East German transgender singer in the first Korean staging of the rock musical Hedwig and the Angry Inch. As the first "Korean Hedwig," Oh received sensational reviews for his performance and he won Best Actor at the Korea Musical Awards. After its run, a sold-out concert featured four of the actors alternating in the lead role, namely Oh, Cho Seung-woo, Kim Da-hyun and Song Yong-jin.

In succeeding years, the rock musical's popularity remained enduring in Korea, attracting other actors to the role in later runs, such as Um Ki-joon, Jo Jung-suk, Song Chang-eui, Yoon Do-hyun, Kim Dong-wan and Park Gun-hyung. When John Cameron Mitchell, who wrote, directed and played the original Hedwig in the 1998 musical and the 2001 film, went to Korea in 2007 to hold a concert, Oh was one of his guest performers, along with other Korean Hedwig actors. Oh was also able to talk to Mitchell one-on-one, without an interpreter, for one and a half hours. Both agreed that the role was emotionally and physically consuming, and Oh added that he used to sit absentmindedly with a cigarette for 20 minutes after finishing his performance. A year later in 2008, Mitchell returned to Korea, and he and Oh headlined a concert to commemorate Hedwig'''s 10th anniversary.

In 2012, seven years after the role made him famous, Oh reprised Hedwig for the rock musical's seventh run in Korea. At a press conference, he jokingly talked about shaving his legs again and being banned from his favorite activities like eating meat, working out, and drinking alcohol, but said that the role was "certainly worth the ordeal." Oh said, "This musical tells us that to love someone is to accept him exactly the way he is. It also tells us that everyone deserves to be loved, and every individual is meaningful and important. I think that's the essential message of this piece."

From stage to screen
Besides portraying Hedwig, 2005 was also significant in Oh's career because of his appearance in the critically acclaimed period drama Shin Don set in Goryeo. He had played minor roles in film and TV before, but the Buddhist monk Wonhyeon was his first major supporting role. (Oh later made a cameo in the 2010 Korean War drama Road No. 1 as a favor to Shin Don director Kim Jin-min.)

In 2006, Oh achieved mainstream fame with the television series The Vineyard Man (also known as The Man of the Vineyard), in his first onscreen leading role as a country guy in charge of a vineyard, who gradually falls for a hapless city girl determined to work there in order to inherit it. The romantic comedy initially had low ratings, but it later surprisingly held its own against ratings juggernaut Jumong, unlike other Korean dramas in the same timeslot. Oh won Best New Actor and the Popularity Award at the 2006 KBS Drama Awards, and he and costar Yoon Eun-hye were voted as the Best Couple among the network's dramas.

Later that year, Oh took on a very different role in Hyena, a risque cable drama about the love lives of a group of four male friends. Oh played a successful, urbane man with such high standards for "the perfect woman," that he's overly fastidious and critical to his dates.

In 2007, he was cast in his first big-screen leading role as a crime fiction novelist in the thriller Our Town. This was followed by the historical drama The King and I, which centered on the tragic love between King Seongjong, his royal concubine and a self-sacrificing eunuch (played by Oh, for which he won Best Actor in a Serial Drama at the SBS Drama Awards).

From 2009 to 2010, Oh starred in the daily drama Jolly Widows, and he received another Best Actor award from the KBS Drama Awards.

Theatre director
He continued to be popular in musicals, appearing in the next several years in Finding Kim Jong-wook (he later made a cameo in its 2010 film adaptation Finding Mr. Destiny),  A Day, and Dreamgirls.

Inspired by the 2007 Lee Joon-ik film, Oh made his debut as a theatre director with The Happy Life, which ran from 2008 to 2009. He was also the musical's lyricist and polished the script. The title is ironic, since the story centers on two characters, a high school music teacher (played by Yoo Jun-sang and Im Choon-gil) and a younger man who's recently been orphaned (played by Ryan and Kim Mu-yeol), who live dull, depressing lives, but the only thing that makes them feel alive and gives them joy is music. Calling it a musical that's "both cheerful and emotionally weighty," Oh said directing made him feel a huge sense of responsibility, fear, and nerves, but he did his best with the actors "to create something.""

For his second directorial project, Oh chose The Organ in My Heart. A stage adaptation of the 1999 film The Harmonium in My Memory set in the 1960s about a 17-year-old sixth grader who develops a crush on a 21-year-old male teacher newly assigned to her village school, Oh had previously starred in the musical's original run in 2008. For the musical's run in 2011, Oh cast Tim and Kim Seung-dae in the lead role.

He then directed The Toxic Avenger (called Toxic Hero in Korean) in 2011. Oh had headlined the comedy musical in 2010, playing a nerd who is reborn as a giant green mutant with superpowers, who fights against corruption and environmental pollution. Oh was praised for successfully transforming into a grotesque, comical character, shedding the gentle image he frequently portrayed in previous musicals and television dramas.

Afterwards, he starred in True West (2010) and 200 Pounds Beauty (2011). The latter is a musical adaptation of the same-titled 2006 romantic comedy film, about an overweight ghost singer who undergoes extensive cosmetic surgery to become a pop star; Oh played her love interest, a music producer.

Back to television
Oh played a professor in What's Up, Song Ji-na's drama about college students in a musical theatre department, which aired on cable in 2011. He also held a series of mini-concerts in 16 cities in Japan that year.

About his supporting turn as a talented but sidelined baseball player in Wild Romance (2012), Oh said, "It's not easy to depict subtle changes in the character's mind. I wanted to portray how unsuccessful people in their 30s and 40s are living in this generation."

Oh described appearing in the short drama format (such as MBC's Best Theater and KBS's Drama City) as a "meaningful experience" for him. He starred in the single-episode That Man's Jealous (2006), Transformation (2007), and Spy Trader Kim Chul-soo's Recent Condition (2010), as well as the four-episode series Special Task Force MSS (2011), and The True Colors of Gang and Cheol (2012).

2013-present
He returned to theater in early 2013. Based on the novel of the same name by Daphne du Maurier and the 1940 film by Alfred Hitchcock, the gothic musical Rebecca takes place in Manderley, a stately mansion owned by aristocratic widower Maxim DeWinter (played by Oh), whose memory of Rebecca, his beautiful dead wife who drowned in a boating accident, keeps haunting him and his new bride.

Jukebox musical Those Days (also known as The Days) featured folk-rock singer Kim Kwang-seok's music, in a story about the president's daughter who goes missing along with her bodyguard, on the day of the 20th anniversary of Korea-China diplomatic relations. Oh played the head of the presidential security service who slowly unravels the mystery of where they've gone.

On television, Oh played the slacker husband of the second eldest daughter in weekend drama Wang's Family.

He then starred as drag queen Lola in the 2014 Korean staging of Kinky Boots, the first international adaptation of the musical since its Broadway premiere in 2013.

In 2018, he starred in the last few episodes of the MBC drama Partners for Justice as Do Ji-han, an experienced Prosecutor. He later reprised his role in the sequel Partners for Justice 2, this time as a major character.

In 2019, he played the character of Cho Cheol-gang in the tvN series Crash Landing on You.

Other activities
Oh is also the vocalist of a band called Little Wing. He owns the OD Musical Entertainment Company, which produced several of the musicals he's starred in.

Personal life
Oh met Jo Sang-gyeong when both were students at the Korea National University of Arts. After dating for a year and half, they married in 2001. Jo went on to a successful career as a costume designer, for films such as Oldboy, Tazza: The High Rollers, The Host and Modern Boy. The couple divorced in May 2007 but remain friends. They have a daughter named Oh Young-joo.

Oh dated Jolly Widows'' costar Jo An for nearly two years, before breaking up in late 2011.

In 2017 it had been reported that Oh Man Suk was in a relationship with a non celebrity, the couple tied the knot in early 2018 and the news was revealed later by his agency in June 2018.

Filmography

Television series

Film

Variety show appearances

Theater

Musical

Play

As theatre director

Discography

Concerts

Awards and nominations

References

External links 
  
 Oh Man-Seok at the Queen AMC 
 
 
 

21st-century South Korean male actors
21st-century South Korean  male singers
South Korean male musical theatre actors
South Korean male stage actors
South Korean male television actors
South Korean male film actors
Korea National University of Arts alumni
1974 births
Living people
20th-century South Korean male actors